Takht is a village in Sardrud-e Olya Rural District, Sardrud District, Razan County, Hamadan Province, Iran. At the 2006 census, its population was 1,883, in 404 families.

References 

Populated places in Razan County